Kill to Get Crimson is the fifth solo studio album by British singer-songwriter and guitarist Mark Knopfler, released on 17 September 2007 by Mercury Records internationally and by Warner Bros. Records in the United States. The album's title comes from a line in the song "Let It All Go." The album cover image is taken from the painting Four Lambrettas and Three Portraits of Janet Churchman by John Bratby, painted in 1958. The first singles from the album were "True Love Will Never Fade" in Europe and "Punish The Monkey" in North America. The album debuted at number 26 on the US Billboard 200 chart, selling about 23,000 copies in its first week. The Kill to Get Crimson Tour promoting the album started on 29 March 2008 in Amsterdam, Netherlands and ended on 31 July 2008 in Miami, Florida. The album was released on CD, CD/DVD, double vinyl LP, and a Deluxe Set of 180g vinyl LP and CD.

The album track "Secondary Waltz" dates from the early '80s, and was mentioned by Knopfler in an interview in 1985.

Touring

Knopfler supported the release of Kill to Get Crimson with the Kill to Get Crimson Tour of Europe and North America, which started on 29 March 2008 in Amsterdam, and included 94 concerts in 88 cities, ending on 31 July 2008 in Miami, Florida. The tour lineup included Mark Knopfler (guitars, vocals), Richard Bennett (guitars), Danny Cummings (drums), Guy Fletcher (keyboards), Matt Rollings (keyboards), Glenn Worf (bass) and John McCusker (fiddle, cittern). The tour included a six-night run at the Royal Albert Hall in London, with Bap Kennedy as the supporting act. Jesca Hoop was the opening act for the North America leg of the tour.

Track listing
All songs were written by Mark Knopfler.

Personnel
 Mark Knopfler – vocals, guitar, producer
 Guy Fletcher – keyboards, producer, engineer
 Glenn Worf – bass guitar, string bass
 Danny Cummings – drums, percussion
 Richard Bennett – guitars
 Ian Lowthian – accordion
 Frank Ricotti – vibraphone
 John McCusker – violin, cittern
 Steve Sidwell – trumpet
 Chris White – flute, saxophone, clarinet

Production
 Chuck Ainlay – producer, engineer
 Rich Cooper – assistant engineer
 Bob Ludwig – mastering
 John Bratby – cover image
 Fabio Lovino – photography

Charts

Weekly charts

Year-end charts

Certifications

References

External links
 Kill to Get Crimson  at Mark Knopfler official website

2007 albums
Albums produced by Chuck Ainlay
Albums produced by Guy Fletcher
Albums produced by Mark Knopfler
Mark Knopfler albums